Silver End is a village in Braintree, Essex, in England. It was conceived as a model village by the industrialist Francis Henry Crittall who established a Crittall Windows Ltd factory there to manufacture components for metal windows.

History
Crittall, or "The Guv'nor" as he was known to his workforce, had a vision to provide his workforce with houses and amenities in close proximity to his window factory. Thus over six years from 1926 Silver End village was built. In 1928, a large department store was opened with 26 various departments under one roof; burnt down in 1951, it was re-built and today houses the Co-op and adjacent shops.

The village hall boasted a first class dance floor, cinema, library, snooker room and health clinic. It is the largest village hall in the UK.

The village includes some noteworthy early examples of Modernist architectural design; the distinctive white, flat-roofed houses on Francis Way and Silver Street are the work of Sir John Burnet and Partners. The Scottish architect Thomas S. Tait, a leading designer of Art Deco and Streamline Moderne buildings in the 20th Century who is also credited with designing the concrete pylons on Sydney Harbour Bridge. Although Thomas S. Tait designed Le Chateau, most of the other houses on Silver Street and Craig Angus and Wolverton were designed by Tait's Irish Assistant, Frederick Edward Bradshaw MacManus. Of note are the steel window frames manufactured by Crittall's firm as a test for their use in the damp English climate.

All major production ceased at the original Crittall site in 2006 when the factory was closed down. However, window frames are still manufactured at a Crittall factory in Witham.

The factory today
The majority of the buildings on the original factory site were demolished during the summer of 2008. Although these factory buildings were in the conservation area of the village, none of them were listed for conservation, although the developer agreed to retain the original 1926 factory and the Power House building, which originally generated electricity for the village. These factory buildings, which originally formed part of the intrinsic character of the village and an integral part of its raison d'etre - as a village in which to live and work, in Crittall's original concept - have thus now been lost. Most of the remaining factory buildings have been unused for some while.

There is now little employment within Silver End and it has become essentially a dormitory village. Any new dwelling houses constructed within the conservation area will be subject to the Article 4 Direction (Town and Country Planning Act 1990) which was served in 1983.  This effectively removed "Permitted Development" rights for replacement windows, doors, etc., on the dwelling houses in the Conservation Area to prevent further inappropriate alterations.

Local facilities
Silver End has a local supermarket for everyday shopping giving local somewhere they can pick up essential items. The nearest large supermarkets are a Morrisons in Witham and Tesco in Marks Farm (Braintree). Today, Silver End has a library, doctor's surgery, chemist, Chinese takeaway, fish & chip shop, Off-licence and also is home to the Western Arms. There is also a working Persons club (Crittalls).

The Village has its own primary school. Secondary schools are situated in and around Braintree and Witham; Alec Hunter Academy in Braintree, Maltings Academy and New Rickstones Academy (both in Witham).

Silver End is also home to 3 Churches.

Transport
Silver End is on a direct link by road between Braintree and Witham, which are both within a 10-minute drive. 

Stephensons of Essex provide local bus services; the 38 and 38a operate regularly between Halstead, Braintree and Witham. Services were operated traditionally by Eastern National, who had a depot in Silver End which was closed in the 1990s.
  
The nearest railway station to Silver End is White Notley, which is on branch line between Witham and Braintree. Services operate hourly between Braintree and London Liverpool Street.

Main line services can be accessed at Witham station, which is situated on the Great Eastern Main Line. Trains travel directly to Hatfield Peverel, Chelmsford, Romford and Stratford to the south; Kelvedon, Marks Tey, Colchester and Ipswich can be accessed to the north.

References

External links

Silverend Parish Council
The Perfect Village (BBC's Restoration Village)

Villages in Essex
Braintree District
Model villages